The 1992 Vyshcha Liha Final is a football match that was played at the Ukraina Stadium, Lviv on June 21, 1992. The match was the 1st league's final and was contested by both groups leaders Tavriya Simferopol and Dynamo Kyiv.

Winning the game allowed Tavriya to qualify for its first European Cup competition in the club's history, while the surprising loss of Dynamo send the club to the 1992-93 UEFA Cup.

Road to Lviv 

The following tables show round by round standing of both clubs in their respective groups, each of which consisted of 10 clubs.

Group A

Group B

Previous encounters 

This was the first Vyshcha Liha Final between the two teams. Previously the two teams met only once in a league format during the Soviet competitions back in 1981 (1981 Soviet Top League). In 1981 Tavriya managed to tie at home 0:0, but lost its away game 1:3 placing second to last, while Dynamo became the champions.

Match
It was decided to conduct the season final at Ukraina Stadium (formerly - Druzhba) in Lviv.

Before the game both teams had some problems with their squad for various reasons. Dynamo was missing Akhrik Tsveiba who still was participating at the UEFA Euro 1992. The club's main striker Viktor Leonenko was serving few months-long disqualification by FIFA, while another Kiev's leader Pavlo Yakovenko was missing due to injury. Tavriya on the other hand was missing disqualified Ihor Volkov and Sergey Andreyev and in addition there was injured Talyat Sheikhametov and the season's top scorer Yuriy Hudymenko did not feel well.

The vast majority of 38,000 fans who filled stands of "Ukraina" supported the capital's team. However, on that hot day the latter was not helped neither by the "12th player", nor early arrival to the city of Leo. All attempts of Anatoliy Puzach's wards establish collective actions were shattered against cool-headed and balanced actions of Simferopolians. Defending with bigger forces, Tavriya was not forgetting about counterattacks. More than often it was simply luring its opponent onto own half of the field, and then, after intercepting a ball, organized sharp and dangerous raids.

Tactics that were picked by Anatoliy Zayaev and his assistant Andriy Cheremysin worked and counter arguments against them were not found by Dynamo's players. The scales were ultimately turned towards Crimeans by the most active performer in their squad. The Tavriya's captain Sergei Shevchenko managed not only ruin attacks of Kievans, but quite often bothered the goalkeeper Valdemaras Martinkenas with far "shots". With 15 minutes before end of the match responding to the serve of Andriy Oparin from a corner kick, the 32-year-old halfback playing to forestall with a soft header, volleyed the ball into goal. "I knew that I will score, after all it was our standardized combination. How many I already laid as such!" – smiled after the hero of the match.

Organization of the final assault during the time that was left for the Dynamo's players was not successful. After the game the former president of FFU Viktor Bannikov awarded the winners with the champion's cup, and personally Shevchenko with the best players of the season award. Beside that Sergei and Kievan Oleh Luzhnyi were awarded embroidered shirts as the most valuable footballers for both teams. After that there was a circle of honor and spectators' applause who at end of the game ardently supported the Crimean club.

Details

See also
 1992 Vyshcha Liha

References

External links 
 Patkevych, K. The gold for all times (Золото на всі часи). "From Sian to Don". Football Federation of Ukraine website. 24 May 2010
 How "Tavriya entered the history (Як «Таврія» увійшла в історію). Ukrainian Premier League.

Vyshcha Liha Final
Ukrainian Premier League finals
Vyshcha Liha Final 1992
Vyshcha Liha Final 1992
Vyshcha Liha Final 1992